Fraley W. Rogers (December 25, 1850 – May 10, 1881) was an American baseball player at the dawn of the professional era. He played primarily for the amateur Star club of Brooklyn. In  he moved to right field for the Boston Red Stockings in the National Association of Professional Base Ball Players, the first professional league now in its second season.

Boston won the championship. It was Rogers' only full season with the pros, but he did play in two games for the Red Stockings in 1873.

Rogers committed suicide with a gun, at the age of 30 in New York City, and is interred at Pine Grove Cemetery in Westborough, Massachusetts.

References

Sources
 Big League Sports - Player Report #21: Fraley Rogers

External links

Major League Baseball right fielders
Brooklyn Stars players
Boston Red Stockings players
Sportspeople from Brooklyn
Baseball players from New York City
Baseball players from New York (state)
Suicides by firearm in New York City
19th-century baseball players
1850 births
1881 deaths
Burials in Massachusetts
1880s suicides